Bharatpur Assembly constituency is an assembly constituency in Murshidabad district in the Indian state of West Bengal.

Overview
As per orders of the Delimitation Commission, No. 69 Bharatpur Assembly constituency covers Bharatpur II community development block, and Alugram, Amlai, Bharatpur, Sijgram and Talgram gram panchayats of Bharatpur I community development block.

Bharatpur Assembly constituency is part of No. 10 Baharampur (Lok Sabha constituency).

Members of Legislative Assembly

Election results

2011
In the 2011 election, Id Mohammad of RSP defeated his nearest rival Daliya Begum of Congress.

Somnath Goswami, contesting as an independent, was a Congress rebel.

1977–2006
In the 2006, 2001, 1996 and 1991 state assembly elections Id Mohammad of RSP won the Bharatpur assembly seat defeating Afzal Hossain Khan of Congress, Debasish Chatterjee, Independent, Satya Narayan Banerjee, Independent, and Abdul Malek of Congress, respectively. Contests in most years were multi cornered but only winners and runners are being mentioned. Satyapada Bhattachatyya of RSP defeated Khairul Khondakar of Congress in 1987 and Abdul Mannan of Congress/ Independent in 1982 and 1977.

1951–1972
Kumar Dipti Sengupta of Congress won in 1972. Khondekor Md Nure Ahasan  of CPI(M) won in 1971. Satyapada Bhattachayya of Congress won in 1969. S.Sinha of Congress won in 1967. Shambhu Gopal Das of RSP won in 1962. Goalbadan Trivedi of Congress won in 1957. In independent India's first election in 1951 Bijoyendu Narayan Roy of Congress won the Bharatpur seat.

References

Assembly constituencies of West Bengal
Politics of Murshidabad district